Mount Pleasant is a historic community located within the southeastern range of Mansfield Township and the northeastern range of Springfield Township, Burlington County, New Jersey. Mount Pleasant encompasses the intersection of Mount Pleasant Road  (running east–west) and Gaunt's Bridge Road (running north–south), . The intersection is located about three miles (5 km) east of Columbus and one mile (1.7 km) south of Georgetown.

Mount Pleasant was named for the area's most conspicuous landmark: a small hill tapering to a pointed peak. Mount Pleasant hill is wooded and it is located in a cultivated farm field in the southwest quadrant of the intersection. A low, wooded ridge runs for about one mile (1.7 km) from the west side of the hill along the south side of Mount Pleasant Road toward Skunk Island Road. South of the ridge and Mount Pleasant Road lies an expansive meadowland that encompasses Assiscunk Creek, the township's southern border. The meadowland was called Ye Great Meadow during the 17th and 18th centuries. North of the ridge and Mount Pleasant Road lie cultivated farm fields that encompass Crafts Creek.

Early history

Mount Pleasant was settled by Quakers during the latter part of the 17th century. In 1688, Mansfield Township was established and its borders were published:
"The Constabulary of Mansfield to lye on ye south side of William Black's Creek, down Delaware River to the town bounds of Burlington, and soe up Birch Creek to John Pancoast's, to Michael Newbold's, and soe ye north of ye Great Meadow to Eliakim Higgins' plantation."

In 1725, Shreve built a brick house to the west of the hill. The east side of the home was constructed in 1742. This property, named Mount Pleasant, was the homestead of the Shreve family for many years. It is the birthplace of steamboat captain Henry Miller Shreve and may be viewed via the Internet link shown below.

The Barzilla and Sarah Newbold house was constructed in 1740 and is located in the northeast quadrant of the intersection. The house is listed on the National Register of Historic Places listings in Burlington County, New Jersey and may be viewed via the Internet link shown below.

Early residents and landowners
John Curtis and Anne, his wife, lived at Ogston, their 347-acre farm located on a ridge west of Mount Pleasant hill.
Thomas Curtis, John and Anne's son, inherited Ogston.
Thomas Curtis, John's brother, owned 150 acres bordering the south branch of Assiscunk Creek.
William Ellis
Richard and Sarah French, (ffrench)
John Butcher
John Pancoast, (Pancas)
Joseph Pancoast, (Pancas)
Eliakim Higgins
Michael Newbold
John Woolston
Thomas Folke, (ffolke)
Thomas Revell, (Revel)
Caleb and Sarah Shreve, (Shreeve, Shrieve)
George Guest
Samuel Willis
Edmund Wells
Godfrey Hancock
Nathaniel Paine, (Payne)
Elizabeth (Woolman) Paine, (Payne)
Robert Hunt
John Harvey
Isaac Gibbs
James Antrum, (Antrim)
Isaac Antrum, (Antrim)
Thomas Barton, In 1685, James Antram of 250 acres in the First Tenth, E. Percifall Towle, adjoining Thomas Barton, Thomas Scattergood, and Nathaniel Richards, including two acres of meadow at Mount Pleasant next to John Curtis. "Patents and Deeds and Other Early Records of New Jersey 1664-1703”
Michael Buffin
Barzilla and Sarah Newbold

Gallery

References and notes

Bibliography
Allen, Luther Prentice (1901). Genealogy and history of the Shreve family from 1641. Greenfield, Illinois: Privately printed. 672 pages.
French, Howard Barclay (1909). Genealogy of the descendants of Thomas French. Philadelphia: Privately printed. pp. 224, 230.
New Jersey Colonial Records, vol. 21, 1664-1703
Nelson, William, and Berthold Fernow (1899). Calendar of records in the office of the Secretary of State. 1614-1703. The Press Printing and Publishing Co.
Tusim, Pearl J. (1976). History of Mansfield Township, 1688-1976. Privately printed. 150 pages.
Tusim, Pearl J. (1976). Record book of Mansfield township, 1697-1773, Book 3. Privately printed. 116 pages.
Woodward, E. M. (1883). History of Burlington County, New Jersey, with biographical sketches of many of its pioneers and prominent men. Philadelphia: Everts & Peck.

External links
Shreve house at Mount Pleasant Nathaniel Rue Ewan's photograph of the Caleb Shreve house at Mount Pleasant as it appeared during the 1930s.
Newbold house at Mount Pleasant Nathaniel Rue Ewan's photograph of the Barzilla and Sarah Newbold  house at Mount Pleasant as it appeared during the 1930s.
Early houses Nathaniel Rue Ewan's photographs of early houses of Burlington County, New Jersey.
Early History of Mansfield Township
Regional map

Geography of Burlington County, New Jersey
Mount Pleasant (Shreve)
Springfield Township, Burlington County, New Jersey
Unincorporated communities in Burlington County, New Jersey
Unincorporated communities in New Jersey
1688 establishments in New Jersey